R. Manoharan is an Indian politician and was a member of the 14th Tamil Nadu Legislative Assembly from the Tiruchirappalli East constituency. He represented the All India Anna Dravida Munnetra Kazhagam party. He was appointed as chief government whip in February 2013.

References 

Tamil Nadu MLAs 2011–2016
All India Anna Dravida Munnetra Kazhagam politicians
Living people
Year of birth missing (living people)
Amma Makkal Munnetra Kazhagam politicians